List of notable protein secondary structure prediction programs

See also 
 List of protein structure prediction software
 Protein structure prediction

Structural bioinformatics software
Protein structure
Protein methods